This is a list of characters appearing on the television program Reno 911!.

Main characters

Lieutenant Dangle 
Lieutenant James "Jim" Ronald Dangle (played by Thomas Lennon) is the flamboyant highest-ranking deputy in the department and is usually seen wearing his trademark short-shorts, which he claims that he wears for "mobility." In a season 6 episode where the officers watch a video of themselves in the late 1980s, Dangle is seen wearing full-length jeans. Unfortunately, his jeans caught fire, forcing Dangle to cut the bottom parts of his pants off, resulting in the hot-pants he currently wears.

Dangle is gay. In an interview about Reno 911 and his character Dangle, Lennon says, "There's always this question, 'When's Dangle coming out?' and I'm like, 'Have you seen the show?' On the first episode, he makes out with another man for about two minutes.. I guess people think he's closeted because Trudy is in love with him, but that has more to do with the fact that she's severely brain-damaged."

He openly harbors an attraction to Jones and occasionally flirts with suspects. In one episode, Jones apparently had sex with him out of sympathy ("I'll try anything once"), after which Dangle was hospitalized because, as Jones said it, "he can't fucking walk." (The incident occurs off-camera, with the actual events undisclosed). Dangle was briefly married to a woman named Debbie (see below) and he briefly believed that he fathered a son (a result of sex with what he thought was a drag queen), but DNA results proved otherwise. Dangle also felt attracted to a female officer from the Department of Homeland Security who was in Reno to conduct counter-terrorism training but the experience left him uncomfortable and confused. It was revealed later that the female officer was actually a very well-disguised man (and was part of a team of con artists, along with the other Homeland Security "trainer"), which caused sexual confusion among the heterosexual deputies who had also felt attracted to "her".

Prior to Trudy's brain damage, Dangle apparently had an affair with her while married to Deb in 1988. Despite her brain damage, he still engages Trudy romantically on occasion, most notably in Reno 911!: Miami, where Trudy asks Dangle to have sex with her out of pity; to which he tries but fails.

Dangle leads the briefings in the mornings, but often ditches work along with a few other officers, as one time Dangle spent an afternoon trying to destroy an old microwave instead of helping investigate a murder. He apparently keeps tabs on officers after or during work, as he is found by Johnson in her favorite salon, using her name for an appointment.

Dangle is favorable to Jones, and compares Jones to "Glue" saying he and the department are "A little birdhouse that Jones is keeping together." Dangle, along with the entire department, is extremely under-qualified for his job, as he is sometimes either seduced or misled by suspects to let them go. Dangle engages in police brutality with his fellow officers, as he once beat a suspect to the point of tears after the suspect had insulted him. Dangle looks up to the FBI, as in an episode where a group of FBI agents come to investigate a murder, he makes his officers line up in a perfect order to greet them, and takes on an "Important" mission to get coffee for the agents happily, but resents them for taking his case.

Dangle once worked as a maitre d' and served in the United States Coast Guard Reserve (stationed in Hawaii) but was discharged for undisclosed reasons (perhaps pertaining to his sexuality). In Episode 102, his age is noted as 41.

Dangle was born and raised in Arkansas. Dangle's father abandoned his family when he was a child and his mother committed suicide, after which he was raised by his Uncle Frederick who was kicked out of the Jesuits. Meanwhile, Dangle's father moved to Chicago and started a new family.

Dangle's father had two more African-American children who appear in Episode 505 to visit Dangle after the death of their father to settle the will. The will turns out to be a bill for the funeral of more than $5,000, and a Banana Splits keychain that Dangle's half-sister gives to him.

Dangle is also the subject of a running gag in which his police bicycle is repeatedly stolen or vandalized. It is hinted that Deputy Junior is responsible for these incidents. Dangle carries a Desert Eagle Handgun while hunting for his bike.

Deputy Wiegel 
Deputy Trudy Wiegel (played by Kerri Kenney-Silver) is a brain-damaged, emotionally unstable, heavily-medicated woman. She is a hypochondriac with multiple psychological disorders, occasional night terrors, and suicidal ideations. She is a generally neurotic person with low self-esteem and an intense love for cats. She claims to be of Irish and Native American descent.

Wiegel enjoys crafts and collecting baby clothes, and is infatuated with Lt. Dangle. Her favorite picnic location is her mother's grave. In Season 2 she began dating a man named Craig Pullin (Kyle Dunnigan), who was revealed to be the "Truckee River Killer". After his arrest and conviction, she continued their relationship via prison visits, both through a glass partition and conjugal visits; they married on the day of his execution. Wiegel's father, mentioned in Season 1 and appearing in Season 5, is a Native American. (Comedy Central censors removed a 30-second story about her father being lynched by a white mob reacting to news that a non-white man "raped" her mother).

The fourth season began with Wiegel returning after six months of personal leave while pregnant; actress Kerri Kenney-Silver's pregnancy was written into the show. 

In Season 6 episode "VHS Transfer Memory Lane" it is revealed that Wiegel's behavior and mental defects are the result of a brain injury that occurred during an explosion at a drug raid in 1988. Wiegel was rendered unconscious by an explosion and was clinically dead for 14 minutes, causing severe brain damage. She was resuscitated by Dangle, who regrets saving her life. The doctor who treated her thereafter said he "should have let her go."  Prior to the drug raid, she was a flirtatious sexpot.

There is some information that contradicts the timeline. In the episode "Stoner Jesus", Jones mentions that he has worked with Wiegel for 15 years, yet in a prior episode "VHS Transfer Memory Lane" aired during the same season, he was shown in the police video tape from 1988 working alongside Wiegel, which would have been 21 years prior to that episode.

Wiegel usually adheres to the department's uniform code, except for when she requests and is granted a new Kevlar vest for women (soon revealed to be ineffective). She wears a looser maternity version of the uniform when pregnant, and makes reference to having worn maternity pants to work. A running gag indicates that Wiegel is ill-equipped to dress properly when performing undercover work that requires seductive clothing, such as an undercover prostitution sting. In such cases, Wiegel wears old-fashioned and over-sized underclothing which fits poorly with her skimpy undercover outfit.

Deputy Jones 
Deputy Sergeant Class II Sisyphus Cosman Jones (played by Cedric Yarbrough) is an emotionally detached African-American "smooth-talker" who frequently channels his need for attention into sexually promiscuous behavior. He is often called "Jonesy" by his co-workers.

Jones was raised in Mound, Minnesota (a suburb of the "Twin Cities" area of Minneapolis-St. Paul). He has been described by Dangle as "a big, hardworking, robust, sort of mocha-ish person." He is a horrible dancer, but a talented singer with a wide vocal range, singing in either a deep baritone or a high-pitched, R&B-style falsetto.

Jones was often partnered with Deputy Garcia and the two were close friends (until Garcia's death at the end of Season 5), even getting jobs together as shopping mall security guards when they lost their jobs as deputies and both getting promoted to mounted patrol, where they were still partners. Jones has some tense moments with him, once punching Garcia for making a racist joke, which caused him to be suspended. In season seven, after it is discovered that Garcia was born in Mexico and has been living as an illegal alien, he and Jones marry to keep him from being deported, after everyone else in the station refused to do so.

Despite Garcia's racism, he and Jones have an awkwardly healthy working relationship. As close as they are, however, they occasionally engage in childish physical altercations with each other. It is implied—typically, by Deputy Williams herself—that he is Raineesha's ex-boyfriend, although he seems to pursue every woman other than her.

Despite Williams' jealous attraction to him, he has an on-again/off-again, "booty call"-type relationship with Deputy Johnson. Jones is the only male deputy that does not have a moustache. Jones' first name was previously unknown, only revealed as starting with "S". In Reno 911!: Miami: The Lost Version, it is revealed that Jones' first name is Sven. However, in the season seven episode "Garcia Self Deports," Garcia refers to him as "Sisyphus Cosman Jones" during the vow exchange of their wedding ceremony.

In an episode in season 6, they watch a tape from the year 1988. In this time, he is revealed to be more confident than his current time, and has a sexual attraction to officer Raineesha Williams. Lt. Dangle then forwards the tape to November 10, 1988 involving a meth lab with armed dealers guarding it. After an assorted amount of mishaps, Jones starts to scream in an extremely high pitch voice, and runs out. Afterwards, he loses all sexual attraction to officer Raineesha Williams, and gained an attraction to officer Clementine Johnson.

Jones is the third in command below Lt. Dangle and Deputy Garcia, who holds the rank of Deputy Sergeant Class III, and is followed by Deputy Johnson, who holds the rank of Deputy Sergeant Class I.

Deputy Garcia 
Deputy Sergeant Class III James Oswaldo Garcia (Season 1–Season 5, Season 7–Season 8; played by Carlos Alazraqui) is an arrogant, racist, sexist, angry and depressed former Marine helicopter pilot. A running gag involves Garcia firing shots at people or objects without hitting them due to his comically terrible marksmanship, and giving suspects "a little of the old stick time", in which he beats them with his billy club. Garcia is the first character shown in the series, in which he responds to a police call at a house. It is revealed that it is a surprise party, but a startled Garcia accidentally shoots a fellow officer.

Garcia is known to be very rough when arresting suspects, perhaps as a result of his inferiority complex. He has shot multiple people despite his poor marksmanship. His personal life is often the subject of ridicule by his contemporaries, who mock his frequent bowel movements (Dangle once said that in the men's room, Garcia sounded like the Battle of Normandy), his excessive masturbation and his habit of drinking alone while watching Hill Street Blues reruns. He has a daughter whom he did not see for several years, which once prompted the other deputies to hire a stripper to pretend to be his daughter in order to elate him. He also has a younger sister, whose life the other deputies manage to wreck, because of their mistaken belief that she was his girlfriend and was cheating on Garcia with another man (who turned out to be her actual fiancé). The film Reno 911! Miami revealed that he had flown an AH-1 HueyCobra for the U.S. Marine Corps.

Garcia is usually partnered with Deputy Jones, leading to situational humor involving Garcia's racism and general ignorance of African American culture; despite this, the two are friends. He has had brief relationships with Deps. Johnson and Williams, and on more than one occasion, it is implied that he harbored a homoerotic attraction to Kenny Rogers. In the Season 4 cliffhanger, he elopes with Dangle's husband-to-be Leslie during their civil commitment ceremony, revealed in the Season 5 premiere to be a bizarre practical joke, as Garcia arrests Dangle and his boyfriend on the grounds that gay marriage is illegal in Nevada.

Garcia is killed in the explosion at "Tacos! Tacos! Tacos! Tacos!" at the end of the Season 5. In the Season 6 episode The Midnight Swingers, his ashes are fired from a cannon, as per his will; however, the deputies' attempt misfires and a squad car is destroyed in the process, for which Garcia is subsequently and posthumously blamed.

Garcia is the second in command below Lt. Dangle, and is followed by Deputy Jones, who holds the rank of Deputy Sergeant Class II, and Deputy Johnson, who holds the rank of Deputy Sergeant Class I.

Alazraqui returned as Garcia on the November 13, 2014 episode of @midnight where it was revealed he transferred to Carson City, and his death was a prank to mess with Wiegel.

Deputy Johnson 
Deputy Sergeant Class I Clementine "Clemmy" Johnson (Season 1–Season 5, Season 7–Season 8; played by Wendi McLendon-Covey) is a promiscuous, trashy, drug-friendly blonde who always wears her uniform partially unbuttoned, exposing her ample cleavage. Johnson is absent in Season 6 as she was seemingly killed in the explosion at the end of the fifth-season finale - this was later revealed to be a prank and she is alive and well in season 7.

Before joining the Reno Sheriff's Department, Johnson was a magician's assistant in Branson, Missouri, an exotic dancer, a Wiccan and a Steely Dan groupie. Her comment at a wedding about performing the night before for the bachelor party clarified that she had an off-duty job. She has a tattoo on her back which once said "Steed" (a one-time boyfriend), later changed to "Steely Dan" after the relationship ended. Early in the first season, she had a relationship with Jones, but she also enjoyed a brief relationship with Garcia in Season 2, a relationship she compared to "getting a flu shot" ("You do it once, and you never have to do it again!"). Despite this claim, she was shown silently mourning the end of the relationship with Garcia. She had Garcia's face tattooed on her breast after a drunken incident when the sheriffs went to Miami, Florida. On one occasion, she married Steed and later discovered the marriage was unofficial because the couple had forgotten to obtain a marriage license. When she mistakenly believed herself to be pregnant, she approached first Jones and then Dangle about marrying her and acting as a father to her unborn child. She had a troubled relationship with her mother because they sometimes argued over men. In one episode her mother was shown to be working as a prostitute.

When the officers were fired following an investigation by District Attorney Mike Powers (Mather Zickel), Johnson returned to touring with Steely Dan (whom she called "The Dan") for a short time before returning to the Reno Sheriff's Department with the others. Johnson was later promoted in Episode 506 when she confronted the Captain of the sheriff's department regarding objectification through the use of the new "Kevlar for Her" vests. She returned claiming she had been promoted, in which case she would be classified as a Sergeant Class I if everyone else (except Dangle and his second-in-command, Garcia, and third-in-command, Jones) is a Deputy.

Johnson is an admitted drunk driver and a user of marijuana, and is usually lenient toward fellow users.

Johnson is the fourth in command below Lt. Dangle, and Deputy Garcia, who holds the rank of Deputy Sergeant Class III, and Deputy Jones, who holds the rank of Deputy Sergeant Class II.

Deputy Williams 
Deputy Raineesha Williams (born Megan Linderman; played by Niecy Nash) is a boisterous woman who enjoys abusing the power over men that her police authority affords her.

Williams' proudest possession is her enormous posterior (a prosthetic that Nash wears under the uniform), which was featured in a pornographic magazine, called "Strong Sistas". She often exclaims "...Haahhh?!?" for effect, after making a blunt statement. She is a single mother, and in one episode claimed she couldn't name the fathers of any of her 3 children, although in another episode, she says that "one of my babies' daddies, he can "read  real good."  In the show's pilot episode, she claimed to have recently split up with Jones, but she's still willing to answer his booty calls. In Season 5, Jones told a reporter that Williams' real name is Megan Linderman.

Jones has described Williams as a terrible police officer ("they don't even put bullets in her gun") and that she can't even read. She often looks for ways to abuse her authority for her personal benefit; she once converted to the Nation of Islam in an attempt to take the month of September (Ramadan on the Islamic calendar) off from work, so she could vacation at the Atlantis resort. She frequently uses Mace merely out of anger. As other deputies have their trademark personalizations on their uniforms, Raineesha always wears a patrol hat.

At the beginning of Season 3, she worked as a real estate agent before returning to the Sheriff's Department.

Deputy Junior
Deputy Travis Junior (played by Robert Ben Garant) is a stereotypical redneck cop who loves beer, buffalo wings, NASCAR, guns, Ernest movies and—perhaps most of all—his moustache, which he confesses he feels makes him look gay when standing next to Lt. Dangle. His character provides much of the physical comedy for the show, performing most of the major stunts.

Junior trains the police dogs for the department and is rarely seen without his trademark aviator sunglasses. He started wearing his Kevlar vest after he was shot and nearly blinded in a 1988 drug sting. Junior always wears his vest over his uniform shirt; he claimed that he forgets to put the vest under his shirt because he is always a little hung over in the morning. He wears his hair in a military "high and tight" haircut and is cross-eyed, which is why he usually wears sunglasses. Despite this, he claims to be the best shot in the department. Perhaps unsurprisingly, he is the only heterosexual male deputy in the Reno Sheriff's Department that Deputy Johnson hasn't slept with.

Junior spends his time stealing Dangle's bicycle, and likes beating suspects. Junior is considered to be an idiot by most of his fellow officers, as one time, he ran after an invisible suspect in a robbery, upon directions by a bystander who happened to have a gun and several bundles of cash from the store, even after the bystander said he had robbed the store after being "Forced".

Junior has three brothers, who also wear sunglasses and have the same traits: Henry "Hank" Junior, Jr., from Panama City, Florida; Lance Corporal "Rooster" Junior, who serves in the U.S. Marine Corps, currently stationed in Tikrit, Iraq; and "Tater" Junior, from Sparks, Nevada. By season 7, he is married to a Korean woman, has a daughter, and his mother-in-law has moved into their house.

Junior has been reprimanded at least twice for his pornography addiction, and is somewhat in denial about his problem. He is revealed to be Deputy Kimball's cousin. In Episode 3x01 (in which the characters are shown in jail) a swastika tattoo is seen on his chest (similar to the tattoo worn by Edward Norton's character in American History X), but in the 2007 film, he is seen shirtless and the tattoo is absent. At the beginning of season 3, Junior worked at a carnival, something he claims is his "dream job".

There are several running gags concerning Junior. The first is the "traffic stop": Junior pulls over a driver and is rendered unconscious or otherwise by an opening door or something falling off from the vehicle. Another running gag with Junior involves him stealing, or tampering with Lt. Dangle's unattended bicycle, much to Dangle's annoyance. The other running gags usually involve him being mauled by dogs, being electrocuted, catching on fire or falling, jumping or being thrown through or off of something, or otherwise incapacitated.

Deputy Kimball 
Deputy Cherisha Kimball (Season 3–Season 5, Season 7–Season 8; played by Mary Birdsong) is a pious, tough, no-nonsense police officer, the polar opposite of Deputy Johnson. Kimball is absent in Season 6, as she was seemingly killed in the explosion at the end of the fifth-season finale - this was later revealed to be a prank and she is alive and well in season 7.

Kimball is originally from Shreveport, Louisiana. She joins Reno Sheriff's Department early in Season 3, winning a competition among top police academy graduates; however, she was only chosen after the two front-runners withdrew for various reasons. She is perpetually accused of being a lesbian, despite her denials when asked, and when asked for dates by lesbians. She spends her off-duty time with her church group (composed of male, Christian virgins), singing karaoke versions of old gospel songs. In one instance, after Kimball states she would be making some major changes in her life after receiving a jet ski, Dangle asked, "You're finally coming out as a lesbian?" He was convinced even after she rejected the statement.

Kimball said that she joined law enforcement because her "past is filled with sin and small time crimes and misdemeanors. Enforcing the law is my way of righting all my wrongs, cleaning up my karma. Also, they give good benefits."  When she is the first to arrive at the scene of Junior's "officer down" radio call, and thinking that his gunshot wound was near-fatal, she eventually admits to having had erotic fantasies of women. Deputy Junior then reveals he was not mortally wounded, and had organized the scenario in an attempt to deceive her into having sex with him. In the course of what she thinks is a conversation with a person about to die, the two exchange information on their family backgrounds; Kimball and Junior gradually realize that they share a common uncle in Louisiana. Despite realizing they share a family member, Kimball and Junior are seen being romantically involved. In the episode Kevlar for Her, Kimball and Junior are seen at a bar together seemingly on a date. At the end of the same episode, Junior is seen secretly admiring a wedding ring, seemingly about to propose to Kimball before shooting her ineffective kevlar vest.

Sergeant Declan 
Sergeant Jack Declan (Season 6–Season 8; played by Ian Roberts) joined the show in Season 6.  He is the new second in command after Lt. Dangle, to whom Declan is often seen sucking up; with the exception being in Season 6 when Department office assistant and barely fluent Cindy mistakenly promotes everyone on the squad to Captain, and Declan tells Dangle to "suck my dick." He is sometimes called "Cap'n Jack" by Dangle and other deputies. He appears confident of himself, when compared to most of the other deputies, but exhibits massive insecurities at other times, such as sobbing uncontrollably and talking to himself through a bathroom stall door, or exhibiting problems with anger management. On one occasion when confronting Cindy about some misplaced clothing he asked her to wash for him, it is alluded to that he may in fact cross-dress, as Junior received the clothing by accident and found extra extra large female undergarments with Jack's initials on them, mixed in with the other clothing. Despite his rage issues, he is still shown to be a very good cop. Declan also carries a bigger and more powerful weapon than the rest of his colleagues. While the other officers carry Beretta 92s, he carries a .44 Magnum revolver.

Deputy Rizzo 
Deputy Frank Salvatore Rizzo (Season 6–Season 8; played by Joe Lo Truglio) joined the show in Season 6. He is from Ozone Park, Queens (where Lo Truglio himself was born), where he has been banned from for undisclosed "reasons that [he takes] full responsibility for". He has a long history in law enforcement, working in many cities across the country and is infatuated with Deputy Wiegel (on one occasion, they engaged in sexual activities in a trailer being pulled by an unsuspecting perpetrator and were left across the Mexican border). Deputy Junior has said that despite his history in law enforcement, Rizzo did not have a single recommendation, which Lt. Dangle considers "breaks even". Rizzo is also able to speak Japanese. Rizzo has two children: Frank "Frankie" Salvatore Rizzo, Jr. and Isabella "Izzy" Salvatore Rizzo, and it is implied that he and his wife have divorced.

Like the other deputies, Rizzo behaves unprofessionally on numerous occasions, also insinuating he has a cocaine habit. On one occasion, he solicited prostitutes to perform oral sex on him and Jones during a narcotics sting, half-jokingly suggesting the two split the drug money impounded in the bust.

Guest characters 
Reno 911! features many other notable comedians, some of whom appear on the show multiple times. In addition, the principal cast members frequently play recurring roles of criminals or otherwise dysfunctional characters (with pixelated or blurred faces).
 Agent Steve Hardcastle (Ian Roberts): An FBI agent who arrives in Reno to help the department locate the Lieutenant Governor's brother, Ray Mendoza. However, his incompetence makes him even more ineffectual than the deputies, and they eventually locate the man without his help. Ian Roberts, who played Hardcastle, arrived several seasons later as Sgt. Jack Declan: heavier, with a mustache.
 Andrew (Jim Rash): A homeowner/brothel patron/purveyor-of-pleasure whose activities require regular police intervention. Unemployed Andrew claims that his job is to "mix things up", which leads to flamboyant yard displays and impromptu parades.
 Bachelorette Party Women: A group of raucous young women who conduct wild bachelorette parties and attempt to lure in male cops to strip for them. On one occasion, Dep. Garcia responds to a call and berates them, then discovers Junior and Dangle in the room clad in underwear, boots and holsters.
 Big Mike (Toby Huss): The resident Reno meth-head and "Captain of Suspicious Behavior." The Reno deputies frequently visit Big Mike's house to investigate complaints of domestic violence and disturbing the peace. It's revealed in Season 6 that Mike was the no-nonsense lieutenant in the Sheriff's Department in 1988 (Junior remarked that he thought Mike was on his way to being Governor of Nevada), until his accidental introduction to methamphetamine at a crime scene began his downward spiral to his current state.
 Boozehammer of Galen (Patton Oswalt): A fantasy role-playing game geek who often badly hurts his opponents while playing fantasy games. He also frequents the "Reno Renaissance Fair." In a deleted scene from Season 2, he is revealed to be Dangle's cousin.
 Brad the Friendly Homeowner (Andrew Daly): A genial householder who is always excited to visit with the Sheriffs. When CSI comes to town and his neighbor shoots at the Sheriffs, he thinks filming has commenced. In Season 5 he tries to purchase Coconut Nut Clusters from the Sheriffs but forgets to sign the check before he commits suicide in the next room.
 Bunny Hernandez (Natasha Leggero): Mayor Hernandez's wife, a former porn actress and exotic dancer. The deputies pull her over for drunk driving thinking she's someone else. When they see that they've got the mayor's wife, they drive her home after she drunkenly falls to the ground, defecates on someone's lawn, and masturbates in the squad car's backseat.
 Calvin Robin Tomlinson (Rainn Wilson): A convicted serial killer who is given a deal to avoid the death penalty if he leads the deputies to the burial site of one of his victims. He makes various demands (a milkshake, watching Cold Mountain on VHS, using a public bathroom for an hour), then leads them to where he hid a gun and a motor scooter, on which he escapes.
 Carmen (Sarah Tiana): A young female with a speech impediment who calls the department "a few times a week."  She has attempted to build stone walls in her front yard to keep terrorists out, and called Deputy Jones, to whom she felt attracted, to her house to help "bust up a chifforobe" (referencing the novel To Kill a Mockingbird). On one occasion, Wiegel and Dangle visit to question her about a missing vacuum-cleaner salesman; it's soon revealed that she murdered and decapitated him in her house ("They come apart real easy", she says).
 Carrot Top (Himself): A comedian who trashes his hotel room, throwing the furniture out the window and into the pool several stories below. He pretends to write a check to the hotel manager, then steals Deputy Jones' gun and escapes in an idling squad car.
 Chief Carl (Carlos Alazraqui): A homeless Native American man who is caught selling illegal fireworks, and summons the police when he is caught at a carnival illegally selling popcorn on a stick. Apparently mentally ill, he bathes in "goat water" and makes outrageous claims, such as that he attended the "1920 World's Fair".
 Cindy the Sex Slave (Wanru Tseng): Freed from bondage by the Reno deputies—she was found stuffed into a suitcase—Cindy has nowhere to go, so she is given a job as a secretary at the Sheriff's Department. She is frequently corrected by the deputies for clerical errors and occasionally falling back into her sex worker habits.
 Citizens' Patrolman Rick (Paul Reubens): First seen in Season 4, he is a member of the "Citizens' Patrol" (which seems to be inspired by the Guardian Angels) and shows up at crime scenes and notices critical things that the deputies have missed. He always seems to be one step ahead of the deputies—because he's the one who committed the crimes.
 Inspector Martin Smiley (Tom Bolster): A British police constable who visits Reno, Nevada as part of the "Badges Across the Water" foreign exchange program. Initially he seems to be a very proper, upright, old-fashioned Englishman and the Reno deputies adore him. Deputy Garcia sees a very different side when Smiley rides along with him. He is shot and killed after attempting to rob a drug den in Reno, and his body is shipped back to the United Kingdom.
 Craig Pullin (Kyle Dunnigan): Dep. Trudy Wiegel's boyfriend, then husband, in Seasons 1-3. While both he and Wiegel appear to be shy, socially awkward people, their sex life includes sexual role-playing and fetishism. Pullin turned out to be the "Truckee River Killer" and was executed by lethal injection at the end of Season 3, immediately after marrying Trudy. In season 7 he returns as what Trudy believes is a ghost but is actually the result of a gas-leak hallucination.
 Debbie (Rachael Harris): Lt. Dangle's ex-wife, who seems to be attracted solely to gay men. She is the heiress to a vacuum cleaner fortune; Jim married her because she was morbidly obese and he believed she would die soon. After they separated, she underwent gastric bypass surgery which turned her into "something the old Deb would have eaten", as he put it. She finally requested a divorce because she had fallen in love with Leslie Frost (see below), who was also clearly gay. Debbie appeared in Season 6 with her new husband, Gary Werner (played by Scott Thompson), who was very effeminate but straight. Debbie died of complications from overeating at Dangle's murder-mystery dinner.
 "Delicious Milkshake Man" (real name: Andrew Freeman) (Nat Faxon): A young man who wears a large milkshake costume to promote a local restaurant. He is harassed, pursued, and beaten by Jones and Garcia in several Season-2 episodes. Finally, a chase ends with him being hit by a tractor-trailer; his death leads to the investigation, termination, and incarceration of all the deputies.
 "Dominatrix" (Debra Wilson): She appeared during Season 5, including a visit responding to complaints from "the kettle-corn people" about explicitly-worded ad flyers she had distributed at the Farmer's Market. According to Dangle, she is actually a transsexual who was named Jeff and was Dangle's swim-teammate in high school.
 The Drunk-Driving Pilot (Ron White):  A drunken airline pilot whom Deputy Johnson lets off with a warning after he flatters her.
 Eddie "Fast Eddie" McLintock (unseen, voiced by Jeff Foxworthy):  A famed drug runner and recidivist speeder who has been involved in multiple high-speed car chases with the Reno Sheriff's Department. He mocks and later commends the Deputies via CB radio. His muscle car and personality are modeled after Burt Reynolds' character from Smokey and the Bandit.
 Firefighters of the Reno Fire Department (Mitch Rouse, Guy Stevenson):  Unlike the Reno Sheriff's Department, the members of the Reno Fire Department are competent, popular, and well-respected, inspiring tremendous envy, bitterness, inadequacy—and secret admiration—from the cops.
 French mime (Robert Ben Garant):  A man in mime costume and makeup who is reported for harassing customers outside a strip mall. To Jones' delight, he performs a silent parody of Garcia—who becomes enraged and assaults, then arrests him.
 The Fraudulent Manager of Burger Cousin (Seth Green): A petty, browbeating robber who poses as the manager of a fast-food restaurant at which Jones and Garcia have gone undercover as employees to catch a robber whom they don't realize is already there.
 Frisbee McDaniels (Zach Galifianakis):  A "white trash" resident of Reno who squats with his sizable family in an abandoned school bus. He owns a .30 cal machine gun which he claims he bought at a yard sale. He uses it to shoot at empty cans, oranges, and UFOs. He casually revealed that his wife is his second cousin. His children's names include Chandler, Ross, Joey, Dharma, and Greg after characters from the popular television sitcoms Friends and Dharma & Greg.
 Glen the Ranger (Matt Walsh): A park ranger at a fictional (though often referenced to be near the Donner Party cabin) National Park. Glen is very lonely and routinely places false 911 calls in order to get some human contact from the sheriff's deputies.
 Gigg LeCarp (Los Angeles radio DJ Brian Phelps):  A petty-criminal-turned-televangelist who, 10 years ago, was arrested by then-partners, Dangle and Garcia. LeCarp was causing trouble while high on PCP, so Garcia used his nightstick to "give him a message from my Lord." He later pretends to "save" Garcia and locks all of the deputies in the holding cell as revenge.
 The Great Jeff (Jeremy Rowley): A magician in the park without a permit that Kimball tries to arrest. Jeff escapes her handcuffs and riot cuffs and then locks her in her squad car.   
 Guy Gerricault (Paul Rudd):  Wiegel's disturbingly enthusiastic, inappropriately hands-on Lamaze teacher.
 Handicapped cop (David Wain):  A supposedly handicapped cop with whom Wiegel spends a day with as part of a public-assistance program.
 Ian Meltzer (Matt Walsh):  Subject to a subpoena being served by Dangle and Junior. Despite initially confirming his identity, his name being on a name tag, and being overheard greeting a caller with his name, he denies being Ian Meltzer and leads the officers on a short chase.
 Jackie DeMartino (Kerri Kenney-Silver):  A drug-addicted prostitute with herpes, AIDS, Lupus, and lung cancer, whose face is always blurred out. She is known for spitting pickle juice at the officers. In Season 1, Dep. Garcia was tasked with cleaning her up and sending her to a halfway home, but Garcia was so dismayed by her extreme burnt-out-crack-whore behavior that he dumped her at a random house that was "halfway"...between the coffee shop at which they had stopped, and his own house. It has been suggested that Trudy and Jackie are similar-looking distant cousins. Jackie died of Lupus in Season 5; it is unknown who plays her in a scene in which Kerri Kenney-Silver as Deputy Wiegel arrives to comfort her as she dies.
 Jerry Salerno (Dan Castellaneta): The violent, possibly mobbed-up "Washoe County Animal Carcass Removal Commissioner." In Season 5, when he's up for re-election, Junior runs against him, but he maintains his office by paying off Junior.
 Joe the Cameraman (Joe Kessler):  The usually-unseen cameraman who documents the Reno Sheriff's Department's activities. He is shown on-camera playing the drums when the deputies respond to a noise complaint about a bad garage band in Episode 2x12 and is also shown in the episode which includes the "second take" of Deputy Junior being thrown through a glass door.
 John (Brian Finney): A crazed man that is seen at a woman's party disturbing the peace. He claims to be an agent of the department of weights and measures, but after trying to make up a story for Johnson and Kimball, he tries to run away but ends up getting caught.  
 Junior the Third (DeRay Davis):  A delusional homeless man, who was once seen sitting on a couch on the sidewalk pretending to interview Morgan Freeman as on a talk show.
 Kenny Rogers (Himself):  A famous American country music singer and actor with whom Dep. Garcia is obsessed to the point of having recurring dreams about him, one of which featured Kenny waking up in bed next to Lt. Dangle. Rogers was shot by an unnamed character played by Patton Oswalt in Season 2 after a poorly-attended book signing. (In another part of that episode, Rogers' real-life son Christopher Cody Rogers played a frat boy trying to get into the locked frat house the morning after a wild night.)
 Kevin (Michael Ian Black). A convicted sex offender who moves to Reno and attempts to ask Johnson out while he and she informs his neighbors of his crimes.
 Ku Klux Klan (Reno Chapter of). A group of presumed bigots who ostensibly try to end bigotry and racism by burning lowercase t's ("for tolerance") and opening a lemonade stand with a sign reading "FREE LEMONADE FOR NIGGERS." One of the KKK members, Gary (Chris Tallman), proposes to his African American girlfriend and in another episode sheds his Klan robes to join Junior and Garcia on a trip to the US/Mexico border to build a wall.
 Trailer-Park Lady (Cheryl Hines):  A trailer-park resident who tries to get her neighbor arrested for crossing over the property line, which consists of two cigarette butts and a green rock. She is later arrested for taking Officer Garcia's nightstick and attempting to hit the neighbor.
 Leslie Frost (Dave Holmes):  Dangle's ex-wife Debbie's second husband, owner of "Buy-Curios", a knickknack/antique store frequented by Dangle and Garcia.
 Maria Storm (Lisa LoCicero):  A local TV reporter who has extensively covered the Reno Sheriff's Department. She is frequently hit upon by her male interviewees. Actress Lisa LoCicero is married to show director Michael Patrick Jann.
 Mayor Hernandez (George Lopez):  Reno's thoroughly-corrupt, philandering mayor. He is perpetually under investigation, but counts on the Reno Sheriff's Department to clean up his messes. Williams says that the Mayor has a "Clintonesque quality" about him, while Dangle describes him as a nice guy who "loves to put his dick in things." In Season 6, Mayor Hernandez was caught on film cheating on his wife with his girlfriend. It has also been revealed that he was  responsible for the deaths of several hookers, with the Reno Sheriff's department disposing of the corpses. Despite his corrupt and erratic nature, Dangle and Junior describe him as the "best Mayor we've ever had, by a long shot", noting that all the other mayors were far worse. Even after being arrested and convicted of several felonies, he wins re-election by a landslide.
 Mike Powers (Mather Zickel): The former Washoe County district attorney, responsible for firing and later jailing the entire Reno Sheriff's Department at the end of Season 2. He is later revealed to be a murderer who decapitates prostitutes. While in prison, the deputies visit him to ask his advice (similar to Hannibal Lecter) on office procedures and other trivial matters.
 Mrs. Leonard (Mindy Sterling): An apartment resident who calls 911 5-6 times a week. One time she reports that children, particularly a fat boy called Joey, are disturbing her 2-3PM nap by bouncing balls, playing marbles, and talking about homework, loudly in the hallway. Ironically, her three dogs are barking the whole time Dangle and Junior are trying to assist her. Junior proceeds to "find Joey" and shoot him five times, and Mrs. Leonard, horrified, sobs in her apartment doorway as Junior and Dangle depart, with Junior  revealing that he shot a radiator.
 Naked Armenian (J. P. Manoux): A naked Armenian man who walks around outside yelling to himself while high on Ecstasy. He gives his name as 'Hrarr Manoogian" and Sgt. Dangle asks "Your name begins with two consonants?".
 The "New" Deputies:  At the end of Season 2, all seven main characters are fired and jailed, to be replaced by other deputies who bear a passing resemblance to them. They are: Jim Kringle "New Dangle" (Martin Mull), Cletus Senior "New Junior" (Lou Ferrigno), Wendy Kelton "New Wiegel" (Sean Young), Officer Garcia "New Garcia" (Lorenzo Lamas), Verlot "New Williams" (Traci Bingham), Barbara Cooper "New Johnson" (Donna D'Errico) and C. Garwood "New Jones" (Wayne Brady). "New Jones", whose name is given in a subtitle as "Deputy C. Garwood", immediately discloses what the "C" stands for, while Jones' "S" initial has remained a secret throughout the show's run.
 Pageant Mom and Dad (Jamie Denbo), (John Ross Bowie): A domineering couple who are obsessed with winning their daughter's little-girl beauty pageants, to the extent of painting her with printer toner (the mother states that the father works at "a computer store" frequently and doesn't know anything about pageants), whitening her lips like a blackface minstrel to win the 'Little Miss Nubian' pageant (which Deputy Williams' daughter won a couple years prior), or attempting to illegally buy Trudy's baby (a boy). They often make inappropriate comments about the other young contestants ("Sexy, sexy kids!"). In Season 4 they are also seen at the local Renaissance Faire trying to stay in character while filing a police report with the deputies. Denbo and Bowie are married in real life.
 Pastor Dave (Ryan Raddatz): A clean-cut looking busker, selling DMT and ecstasy to the youths of Reno.
 Pinky the Drunk Driver (Chelsea Handler):  A belligerent drunk driver who claims she has not been drinking.
 Pot Dealer (Matt Besser): A man that calls 911 because his illegal weapons got stolen. In another episode he is seen calling 911 again because someone came to his house to buy weed when he wasn't selling it because his "business" is closed on Sundays and claims that the deputies are trespassing. He is then arrested for talking back to them.   
 Principal Manderville (Kristina Hayes):  A local elementary-school principal who usually makes an announcement to the students before the Reno deputies begin their "safety assembly."
 "Reading Ron" (Brian Unger):  A children's TV host with a checkered past who attempts to profile the Reno Sheriff's Department on his television show, with results that are disastrously inappropriate for children's television. He is later forced into rehab after a drug relapse, but retains his job.
 Roadie (David Koechner): A roadie at Steely Dan, Ted Nugent, and Motörhead concerts.
 Seeeeemji (Christina Applegate):  Terry Bernadino's girlfriend, whom the deputies are very surprised to learn is real. The "j" is silent.
 Sergeant Clift (Ryan Stiles):  A consultant that the L.A.P.D. sends over to help the deputies improve their undercover work because, as Dangle says, "They can smell that we're pigs from a mile away." Clift puts the deputies through acting exercises that backfire horribly when put into practice.
 Sheriff Walter Chechekevitch (Tracey Walter):  The deputies' aloof, clueless boss who died after eating a candy bar because he was allergic to the peanuts it contained. He had made so few appearances to the Sheriff's Department that they never remembered his name. Despite this, he is fondly remembered as the best Polish Sheriff Reno has ever had. (Junior amended: "Not the best, but pretty good for a Polack.")
 "Spanish Mike" Alverez a.k.a. "Captain Duane Hernandez" (Oscar Nunez); and Sammy Heung a.k.a. Lt. Suzy Kim (Cathy Shim): "Hernandez" and "Kim" are criminals who pose as Department of Homeland Security agents to get their hands on the Reno Sheriff's Department's money and evidence in the two-part episode "Terrorist Training". Wiegel falls for Hernandez and Suzy Kim turns out to be a man in the plot arc. Hernandez is later apprehended and held under close arrest, but makes every effort to seduce the female deputies and escape.
 Steed Lankershim (Timothy Brennen):  Johnson's criminal boyfriend, a repeat felon and drug user.
 Steve Marmella (Jack Plotnick):  A sexual pervert who specializes in exposing himself and tricking others into inappropriate sexual contact. As of Season 5 he is under house arrest, which does surprisingly little to deter his activities. He is often seen "working" at a carnival.
 Deputy Patrick Bates (Jack Plotnick):  A once-promising new recruit whom Dangle accidentally shot in the head on his first day, rendering him mentally-challenged and wheelchair-bound. The department avoids paying a huge settlement by letting him return and assigning him to phone duty (using a Fisher-Price phone).
 Stevie (Brian Posehn):  The Reno medical examiner and coroner. In Episode 4x07, he is arrested for being intoxicated on the job: after Dep. Junior asks him "Are you stoned right now?" he laughingly replies, "On pot? Oh yeah!" and is cuffed and led out of the exam room. Just 2 episodes later, he's back on the job.
 Student Driver (Simon Helberg):  In episode S02E10, Garcia and Jones pull him over during his driving test. After they give him field sobriety tests and threaten to take him to jail, he grabs both officers' weapons and shouts "You're not stopping me from getting my license!" He then orders them into their squad car's trunk and backs it into the curb before pulling away, braking erratically. Helberg appears in another episode as a Jewish teen who claims his mother has given him a blank check to hire a Jewish hooker to help him become a man on his birthday.
 Theoretical Criminal (Keegan-Michael Key):  A criminal with a lisp who frequently calls the Reno Sheriff's Department to report crimes he claims he did not commit, or to show the deputies illegal items he has "found." He often says, "Hypothetically speaking, If I did perpetrate the crime, if I had done it, what would the repercussions be?" The deputies  play along, but always end up arresting him.
 T. T. (played by Niecy Nash):  A braless, hysterical woman with pronounced buck teeth and a unibrow (visible even though her face is always pixelated). She constantly screams nonsensically about imaginary events and claims that police sticks remind her of her father who is also "skinny and black."
 Terry Bernadino, a.k.a. Terry Jaspermans (Nick Swardson):  A gay, drug-addicted prostitute and compulsive liar who always wears rollerskates and bedazzled women's clothing. He is often seen around the jail and other local establishments looking for johns, or working at a taco shop. When confronted by the deputies, he offers silly, implausible explanations (e.g., when making a phone threat to cut somebody with a knife, he explains to the deputies that the victim is made of cake, and in his first appearance, saying he sells oranges and drops them in the customer's laps, to explain selling handjobs on the street). At the end of the film Reno 911!: Miami, it is revealed that Terry is tremendously wealthy. Despite his flamboyant homosexuality, he vehemently denies being gay. At one point he introduces the deputies to his fiancee Seeeeemji (pronounced "see-me") who is completely oblivious to Terry's sexuality although, according to Terry, when they get naked together he vomits and can't get hard. Terry has made more appearances than any other side character and is a fan favorite. He also starred in the short, "A Very Terry Christmas", included in the special features of the Nick Swardson: Seriously, Who Farted? DVD.
 Tommy Hawk (Diedrich Bader): An egotistical bounty hunter and reality-television star who is after many of the same fugitives that the deputies are pursuing. He is a parody of Dog the Bounty Hunters Duane "Dog" Chapman.
 Unnamed Chinese boy (Kit DeZolt):  A poor Chinese boy who drives a rickshaw.
 Unnamed couple (Charlie Day and Mary Elizabeth Ellis): An incestuous "white trash" couple who call the police over a domestic dispute where he is threatening to rip the head off her (plastic "squeaky") baby. Day and Ellis are married in real life.
 Unnamed Armed Naked Guy at the VFW (Steve Little):  An apparently high man with white powder under his nose who is regularly seen naked and holding a gun while making nonsensical statements.
 Unnamed middle-aged insane woman (Wendi McLendon-Covey):  Seen pantless, dragging a water heater through the streets.
 Unnamed drunk pantless hooker (played by Natasha Leggero): Fights with Dangle and Kimball about putting her clothes on and tries to evade arrest.
 Unnamed redneck (played by Robert Ben Garant):  A local redneck, usually seen with his pants down and his penis in an inappropriate object (such as a pumpkin or a birdhouse). His only line is an enthusiastic "Woo!" right before running away.
 Virgil Medlock (Damon Jones): The owner of Hotty's, the first corporate sponsor for the police department. He basically owns the department but gives the deputies free wings that make the deputies gassy. He also gives the deputies new vehicles, uniforms, and Miranda warnings. At the end of the episode, he terminates the partnership because he felt it "wasn't working out" with the deputies.      

Others
 Danny DeVito as himself (Season 2)
 Lisa Lampanelli as the minister at Dangle's gay wedding (Season 4)
 Jill-Michele Meleán (Season 3 as Maria, Dep. Garcia's Sister and Season 6 as Mayor Hernandez's girlfriend)
 Chino XL (Season 2)

References

External links

 
 

Lists of American comedy television series characters
Lists of American crime television series characters